Chongqing Jiangbei International Airport  is located in Yubei District, Chongqing, China. The airport's IATA Airport code, CKG, is derived from the city's former romanized name, Chungking. Jiangbei airport is also a 128-hour transit visa-free airport for foreigners from many countries. It was awarded first place in the "Best Airport in the 25–40 Million Passenger Size" category by Airports Council International in 2017 and again in 2018.

Chongqing is a focus city of Air China and Hainan Airlines.

The airport has three terminals: Terminal 2 serving domestic flights and Terminal 3A other domestic flights and all international flights while Terminal 1 is currently closed. The first, second, and third phases of the airport came into operation in January 1990, December 2004, and December 2010, respectively. Terminal 2 is capable of handling 15 million passengers and Terminal 3A 45 million passengers annually.

In terms of passenger traffic, Jiangbei Airport was the ninth-busiest airport nationwide in 2018, handling 41,595,887 passengers with a year-on-year growth of 7.4 percent. The airport was the eighth-busiest airport by traffic movements and tenth-busiest airport by cargo traffic in China in 2016.

History
The civil aviation of Chongqing dates back to the 1920s. After the completion of Baishiyi Airport in 1938, Chongqing became one of the four cities in China that had an airport in operation. In 1950, four flight routes from Tianjin, Chengdu, Guangzhou and Kunming to Chongqing became the earliest to be opened after the establishment of the People's Republic of China in 1949. In 1965, the Civil Aviation Administration of China opened an office in Sichuan Province and Chongqing Airport became subject to it. The development of Chongqing's civil aviation then stopped until the 1990s.

On 22 January 1990, the new airport, Chongqing Jiangbei Airport was opened to replace the old Baishiyi Airport's commercial flight functions, which remained open as a military airport. The development of the civil aviation resumed. In 1997, when the Chongqing area became a 4th municipality of China, Civil Aviation Administration of China established a branch in Chongqing in the same year.

Development
Chongqing Jiangbei International Airport is currently undergoing a major expansion, with a vision of obtaining a major international air hub and becoming the largest airport in western China by 2030.  Jiangbei Airport has been outlined ambitious growth plans, competing with Chengdu Airport, Kunming Airport, Wuhan Airport and Xi'an Airport to be recognized as the nation's fourth largest aviation hub (after those hubs in Beijing, Shanghai, and Guangzhou).

Jiangbei Airport was reported to have reached the fastest growth rates since 2011, according to CAPA's Airport Traffic Benchmark Tool. On 1 November 2015, the annual passengers at Jiangbei Airport exceeded 30 million for the first time.

Airport expansion

The expansion project Phase III, which included a second runway and an additional Terminal, T2, started construction in 2007 and completed in 2010. Major elements of the construction were adding a second runway of 3,200 meters (which was later lengthened to 3,600 meters to satisfy the landings and takeoffs of Boeing 747 and the demands of Hewlett-Packard Development Company, L.P.) to the east of the existing runway, building a parallel taxiway in between the two runways, and setting up a visual aid lighting support system. It cost CNY3.3 billion (US$538 million). On 22 December 2010, the second runway was commissioned, which made Jiangbei Airport the fourth airport in mainland China to operate two runways, one exclusively for departures and the other exclusively for arrivals.

The most recent expansion - Phase IV (dubbed the Eastern Expansion) - of Jiangbei Airport has been the biggest and contains the construction of a third runway and a new terminal, T3A, being 530,000 square meters, more than double the size of the existing terminals (T1 and T2A/T2B) combined, costing CNY26.0 billion (US$4.1 billion). Most of T3A’s construction work was completed by the end of 2016. The terminal was inaugurated in August 2017, after which the airport has more than 725,000 square meters of terminal floor space, ranking Jiangbei Airport among China's 15 largest airports with an annual passenger capacity of 60 million and an annual cargo capacity of 2 million tons.  Half of the terminal (concourses G & H) is for international flights from major cities in South East Asia, East Asia, Middle East, Africa, Europe, and North America. After the completion of expansion Phase IV, Jiangbei Airport became the fourth airport in Greater China (inc. Hong Kong, Macau, and Taiwan) that has three runways in operation, of which Runway #3 (03/21) is operated independently on top of the pair #1 (02L/20R) and #2 (02R/20L).

The fifth phase of expansion for Jiangbei Airport is currently underway. It is expected to include a new terminal, namely T3B, designed by Zaha Hadid Architects and CSWADI, and a fourth runway. This phase will be finished in the mid-2020s.

Note: Remote bays include the ones that serve the air freighters.

Surge in cargo traffic

Cargo traffic increased at an average rate of 14% in the first six months of 2011, driven by exponential growth in international cargo. International cargo/mail volumes increased by 12 times from 2010 levels in the first half of 2011, to more than 9000 tonnes. In the second half of 2011, this growth rate is expected to be maintained, with Hewlett-Packard, Asus and other brands of large international IT production capacity supporting the increase, to an anticipated 60,000 to 80,000 tonnes of international cargo throughout the whole year.

New international routes

Before 2010, Chongqing Jiangbei International Airport's international destinations all terminated in East and Southeast Asia, including direct flights to Tokyo (has stop-over in Beijing or Shanghai), Seoul, Singapore, Bangkok, Phuket, Siem Reap, etc. In 2011, Qatar Airways opened a new route to Doha. Finnair’s services to Helsinki would later be added in 2012. 

With the new T3A terminal in operation since August 2017, the airport has had multiple new international routes with non-stop flights to London, Dubai, Los Angeles, New York, Sydney, Melbourne, Rome, Paris, Budapest, etc. 
T3A Terminal and the third runway of Chongqing Jiangbei International Airport started operation at 06:00 on 29 August 2017. In the meantime, T1 was temporarily closed, T2 serve only domestic flights operated by Sichuan Airlines, West Airlines, Huaxia Airlines and Spring Airlines, and the remaining flights were transferred to T3A.  In addition, the airport operates a free trans-shipment shuttle between T2 and T3A in a 24-hour operation.

Statistics

Source: CAAC (Civil Aviation Administration of China)

Number of domestic and international/regional passengers (bar chart, 2009–2018)

Source : CQA (Chongqing Airport Group Co., Ltd.)

Airlines and destinations

Passenger

The following airlines operate regular scheduled flights to and from Chongqing

Cargo

Ground transportation
The airport's ground transportation is developing very fast. Four highways around the airport are either under construction or have been built, as part of plans to turn Chongqing into an integrated regional transport hub in western China. There is a  GTC (Ground Transportation Centre) in front of T3A’s main terminal building, providing transfer to inter-city rail, metro, buses, long-distance coach and taxis.

General plan of integrated transportation Hub at Chongqing Jiangbei International Airport:
 One inter-city rail: Branch of Chongqing-Wanzhou Inter-City Rail
 Two lines of Chongqing Rail Transit:  Line 3 and Line 10
 Three latitudinal roadways: (1) outer ring expressway, (2) relocated National Highway G319, and (3) southern connecting freeway
 Four longitudinal roadways: (1) first freeway of CKG Airport (National Highway G210), (2) second freeway of CKG Airport (under construction), (3) Chongqing-Linshui expressway, and (4) northern connecting roadway

Bus

Airport bus
Airport Express lines are easily accessible at Terminals 2 and 3.
Route K01: Jiangbei Airport → Jiazhou → Damiao → Shangqingsi → Chongqing Great Hall → Jiefangbei. It takes about 50 minutes from the airport to the city centre (Jiefangbei).
Route K02: Jiangbei Airport → Qixia Road → North Square of Chongqingbei Railway Station. 40 minutes may be taken from the airport to the High-Speed railway station. 
Route K03: Jiangbei Airport → Yanggongqiao (Shapingba)
Route K05: Jiangbei Airport → Sigongli Bus Terminal
Route K06: Jiangbei Airport → Chongqing West Railway Station
Route K07: Jiangbei Airport → Shapingba Railway Station

Long-distance coaches
There is a transfer center for long-distance coaches between Terminal 2A and Terminal 2B, and it offers bus services to nearby cities in Sichuan and Guizhou Province, as well as suburban areas of Chongqing Municipality.

Car

There is currently one airport freeway connecting the city center with the airport, and the second one is under construction and will be put into operation in the late 2016. The airport freeway is 23 kilometers long, but it usually takes as many as 30 minutes to get from the city center to the airport because of the heavy traffic.

Parking
The airport has four parking lots:
International (Outdoor) Parking Lot, located in front of Terminal 1 (With certain sections transformed into a drive-in cinema since March 2022)
Domestic (Outdoor) Parking Lot, located in front of Terminal 2
Underground (Indoor) Parking Lot, located under Terminal 2
Central Parking Garage, located in the GTC (Ground Transportation Center) in front of Terminal 3
All together, the airport can accommodate about 7,300 cars at one time.

Rail

Chongqing Rail Transit

It takes around 50 minutes to get to the city center (Lianglukou).

Line 10, serves as the second metro line connecting the urban areas of Chongqing and the airport.  One station of Line 10 is at Terminal 3 and the other is at Terminal 2. This line runs under Runways #1 (02L/20R) and #2 (02R/20L), connecting Terminal 2 and Terminal 3 in landside. Line 10 is the only metro line access to the new Terminal 3, while Line 3 will not be elongated to Terminal 3. Line 10 also reduces the travel distance between Chongqing Jiangbei International Airport and Chongqingbei Railway Station, which can facilitate the transfers of passengers between air and rail.

China Railway (Inter City trains)
Terminal 3A has a huge underground railway station located within its GTC (Ground Transportation Center). It is built 90 degrees adjacent to the CRT Line 10 metro station. The rail station opened on 30 December 2022, initially with limited service to stations along the Chongqing Railway Eastern Loop, forming the Airport Branch of said rail line. It is one stop away from the closest railway hub, Chongqing North Railway Station.

The station, is however, designed to connect cities as far as 300 kilometers away, thus allowing Chongqing Jiangbei International Airport to serve a significantly larger population. The speed of the trains is designed to be 250 to 300 kilometers per hour, allowing journeys to take less than one hour from a relatively faraway locations within the Greater Chongqing Municipality.

Other facilities
The headquarters of China Express Airlines are on the airport property.

Incidents
 On July 8, 2020, a Ruili Airlines Boeing 737 flying from Xi'an to Kunming had to make an emergency landing at Chongqing Jiangbei International Airport after suffering a broken cockpit window and plunging 10,000 feet before pilots recuperated control of the aircraft. None of the plane's occupants were injured during the incident.
 On May 12, 2022, a Tibet Airlines Airbus A319-100, operating as Tibet Airlines Flight 9833 from Chongqing to Nyingchi Mainling Airport in Nyingchi, Tibet, left the runway after an aborted takeoff because of an "abnormality". The planes engines then scraped on the lawn, causing them to break and burst into flames. All 113 passengers and 9 crew members evacuated safely, but 36 of them suffered from minor injuries.

See also

Chongqing Baishiyi Air Base
List of airports in the People's Republic of China

References

External links
 Chongqing Jiangbei International Airport 

Airports in Chongqing
Airports established in 1990
1990 establishments in China
Yubei District